Cryptosaccus asturiensis is a species of air-breathing land snails, terrestrial pulmonate gastropod mollusks in the family Hygromiidae, the hairy snails and their allies. This species is endemic to Spain.

References

Cryptosaccus
Endemic fauna of Spain
Endemic molluscs of the Iberian Peninsula
Gastropods described in 1994
Taxonomy articles created by Polbot